USS Sitkoh Bay (CVE-86) was the thirty-second of fifty s built for the United States Navy during World War II. She was named after Sitkoh Bay, located within Chichagof Island, of the Territory of Alaska. The ship was launched in February 1944, commissioned in March, and served as a replenishment and transport carrier throughout the Philippines campaign, the Invasion of Iwo Jima and the Battle of Okinawa. She was decommissioned in November 1946, when she was mothballed in the Atlantic Reserve Fleet. With the outbreak of the Korean War, however, she was called back to service, continuing to serve as a transport and utility carrier with the Military Sealift Command until 1954, when she was once again decommissioned, and mothballed in the Pacific Reserve Fleet. Ultimately, she was broken up in January 1961.

Design and description

Sitkoh Bay was a Casablanca-class escort carrier, the most numerous type of aircraft carriers ever built, and designed specifically to be mass-produced using prefabricated sections, in order to replace heavy early war losses. She displaced  standard,  with a full load. She was powered with two Skinner Unaflow reciprocating steam engines, which drove two shafts, providing , thus enabling her to make . Power was provided by four Babcock & Wilcox water-tube boilers. Her compact size necessitated the installation of an aircraft catapult at her bow, and there were two aircraft elevators to facilitate movement of aircraft between the flight and hangar deck: one each fore and aft.

One /38 caliber dual-purpose gun was mounted on the stern. Anti-aircraft defense was provided by eight Bofors  anti-aircraft guns in single mounts, as well as 12 Oerlikon  cannons, which were mounted around the perimeter of the deck. By the end of the war, Casablanca-class carriers had been modified to carry thirty 20 mm cannons, and the amount of 40 mm guns had been doubled to sixteen, by putting them into twin mounts. These modifications were in response to increasing casualties due to kamikaze attacks. Although Casablanca-class escort carriers were designed to function with a crew of 860 and an embarked squadron of 50 to 56, the exigencies of wartime often necessitated the inflation of the crew count. Casablanca-class escort carriers were designed to carry 27 aircraft, but the hangar deck could accommodate more, which was often necessary during transport or replenishment missions.

Construction
Her construction was awarded to Kaiser Shipbuilding Company, Vancouver, Washington under a Maritime Commission contract, on 18 June 1942. The escort carrier was laid down on 23 November 1943 under the name Sitkoh Bay, as part of a tradition which named escort carriers after bays or sounds in Alaska. She was laid down as MC hull 1123, the thirty-second of a series of fifty Casablanca-class escort carriers. She therefore received the classification symbol CVE-86, indicating that she was the eighty-sixth escort carrier to be commissioned into the United States Navy.

Service history

World War II

Upon being commissioned, Sitkoh Bay underwent a shakedown cruise down the West Coast to Naval Air Station Alameda, and upon arriving on 28 April, she took on a load of cargo and passengers. She left Alameda on 30 April, bound for Pearl Harbor, and for the next half-year, she carried out routine transport missions between California and various bases scattered throughout the Central and South Pacific, as a part of Task Group 30.8, the Fleet Oiler and Transport Group, under the command of Captain Jasper T. Acuff. For example, during the latter part of 1944, she touched Majuro in the Marshall Islands, Manus in the Admiralty Islands, transiting via Pearl Harbor. The aircraft and passengers delivered on these transport missions went to the United States Third Fleet and the United States Seventh Fleet, respectively, although the ship's action report did note that a significant portion of these replenishment aircraft were recycled from damaged carriers returning to the backline, and that they were often in rather poor condition. The air personnel that were delivered could also be of questionable quality, with some sitting in the reserve pool rarely flying for up to eight months. For example, the flight surgeon of Sitkoh Bay reported visiting a pilot who suffered from epilepsy, and another pilot who displayed a suicidal ideation regarding hurling himself into a spinning propeller.

In January 1945, Sitkoh Bay became a replenishment carrier solely dedicated to resupplying the Third Fleet within the Central Pacific, as it participated in the Philippines campaign, the Invasion of Iwo Jima, and prepared for the Battle of Okinawa. During this period, her ports of call included Guam and Roi-Namur, both in the Marianas Islands, Enewetak Atoll in the Marshalls, and Ulithi Atoll, located in the Caroline Islands. On one of these stops, Captain James Paul Walker raised his flag over the vessel on 1 February.

Together, the four escort carriers had the task of delivering Marine Aircraft Group 31, of which Sitkoh Bay was assigned to transport, and Marine Aircraft Group 33, in total consisting of 192 F4U Corsairs and 30 F6F Hellcats to Okinawa. There, they would be the first land-based aircraft to participate in the battle, operating off of the captured Kadena Air Base.

The Special Escort Carrier Group departed from Ulithi on 2 April, and Sitkoh Bay arrived off of Okinawa on 6 April without much incident, although the screening destroyers dropped depth charges on the way to deter a suspected submarine. Therefore, she began transferring her air contingent to land. On 7 April, however, the escort carriers came under kamikaze attack. By 15:28, she had already launched eight Corsairs, and the flight deck was being respotted when a Yokosuka P1Y kamikaze aircraft made an appearance. The kamikaze was engaged by five fighters of VMF-311 operating off of Breton, and although they did heavily damage the aircraft and set it on fire, the kamikaze was able to get close enough to make a dive for the bridge of Sitkoh Bay. The following day, on 8 April, she left the area for Pearl Harbor, stopping at Guam. There, she returned to her previous replenishment routine.

After the announcement of the Surrender of Japan on 15 August, Sitkoh Bay continued her replenishment duties with the Third Fleet, cruising with it along the southeastern coast of Honshū from 25 August to 5 September. On 10 September, she entered Enewetak harbor, before departing on 11 September for Guam. She then made transport missions ferrying between Guam, Samar Island in the Philippines, and Okinawa. She returned to Pearl Harbor on 18 October, and proceeded eastwards, arriving at San Diego on 26 October for availability. After a series of further transport missions to the Central Pacific throughout the rest of 1945 and 1946, she steamed into Bremerton, Washington on 30 November 1946, where she was decommissioned and mothballed with the Pacific Reserve Fleet, as part of its Bremerton group.

Korean War

Sitkoh Bay continued to be mothballed with the Pacific Reserve Fleet until the Korean War broke out during the summer of 1950. With the United States intervening in the war, under the auspices of the United Nations, Sitkoh Bay was recommissioned and reclassified as an aircraft transport with the hull symbol T-CVE-86 on 29 July 1950 at Bremerton, with Captain Charles Williams Lord in command. As an aircraft transport, she was operated by the Military Sea Transportation Service (MSTS) with a civilian crew, but with a military command. For the next four years, she transported aircraft between the West Coast and Japan. Her major ports of call were San Francisco, San Diego, Pearl Harbor, Yokohama, and Yokosuka.

Sitkoh Bay only deviated from these ports of call three times during this time period. In March 1951, she delivered a load of F8F Bearcats to French Indochina, where the French were fighting against the Viet Minh in the First Indochina War. On her way back, she stopped at Manila, the capital of the Philippines. In September 1951, she visited Pusan, Republic of Korea. In May 1952, she sailed directly from Yokosuka back to San Francisco, without stopping at Pearl Harbor on the way back.

With the end of the Korean War, the demand for aircraft in the Pacific theater decreased. Therefore, Sitkoh Bay was decommissioned again on 27 July 1954, when she rejoined the Pacific Reserve Fleet, this time as part of its San Francisco group. On 12 June 1955, she was redesignated as a utility aircraft carrier, receiving the hull symbol CVU-86. In mid-March 1958, she was moved south from San Francisco to San Diego. On 7 May 1959, she was redesignated as an aviation transport, receiving the hull symbol AKV-86. She was struck from the Navy list on 1 April 1960, and subsequently sold for scrapping to Eisenberg & Co. of New York City on 30 August. The ship was ultimately scrapped in Japan throughout January 1961. Sitkoh Bay received three battle stars for her World War II service, and one for her Korean War service.

References

Sources

Online sources

Bibliography

External links 

 

 

Casablanca-class escort carriers
World War II escort aircraft carriers of the United States
Ships built in Vancouver, Washington
1944 ships
S4-S2-BB3 ships